The Doolittle method may refer to:

 The Doolittle algorithm for LU decomposition in numerical analysis and linear algebra
 The most common method of rearing queen bees